Hieracon or Hierakon (Ptolemy vi. 7. § 36), also called Theracon, Egyptian pr nmty, was an ancient fortified city of Upper Egypt situated on the right bank of the Nile, now the site of the modern-day village of al-ʿAtawlah, Egypt. Here, in Roman times, was quartered the cohors prima of the Lusitanian auxiliaries.

Hieracon is distinct from Nekhen (Hierakon polis Strabo xvii. p. 817), which was south of Thebes, lat. 25° 52′North, nearly opposite Eileithyias polis (Egyptian Nekheb, modern El Kab), and capital of the third nome of Upper Egypt.

References

External links
Archaeology

Cities in ancient Egypt
Former populated places in Egypt